Sedan is a census-designated place (CDP) in Gallatin County, Montana, United States. The population was 99 at the 2010 census. It is located on Montana Highway 86, 27 miles from Bozeman. The Zip Code 59086.

Climate
This climatic region is typified by large seasonal temperature differences, with warm to hot (and often humid) summers and cold (sometimes severely cold) winters.  According to the Köppen Climate Classification system, Sedan has a humid continental climate, abbreviated "Dfb" on climate maps.

Demographics

References

Census-designated places in Gallatin County, Montana
Census-designated places in Montana